is a railway station in the village of Ōkuwa, Nagano Prefecture, Japan, operated by Central Japan Railway Company (JR Tōkai).

Lines

Layout
The station has one opposed ground-level  side platform and one island platform connected by a footbridge with the wooden station building, which dates from the 1909 construction of the station. The station is staffed.

Platforms

Adjacent stations

|-
!colspan=5|

History
Nojiri Station was opened on 1 September 1909. On 1 April 1987, it became part of JR Tōkai.

Passenger statistics
In fiscal 2015, the station was used by an average of 116 passengers daily (boarding passengers only).

Surrounding area
 Ōkuwa Elementary School
Nojiri Post Office
Kiso River

Nojiri-juku (Nakasendō)

See also

 List of Railway Stations in Japan

References

Railway stations in Japan opened in 1909
Railway stations in Nagano Prefecture
Stations of Central Japan Railway Company
Chūō Main Line
Ōkuwa, Nagano